Lauren McKnight (born October 3, 1988) is an American actress. She is best known for her role as Skye Rotter in MTV's My Super Psycho Sweet 16 trilogy (2009–2012).

Career
McKnight began her career when she was seventeen at 2005 in Disney Channel's TV Movie Go Figure. She then landed a supporting role in feature film Unaccompanied Minors in 2006. In 2007, she starred in the film Whisper Island, in which she played the role of Sam Dalton.

She is also known for her roles in the 2008 television series Lifeless and teen romantic comedy HottieBoombaLottie which was picked up by MTV.

In 2009 she played the lead role, serial killer's daughter Skye Rotter, in MTV's My Super Psycho Sweet 16. In 2010 she reprised her character in My Super Psycho Sweet 16: Part 2, and again, for the final time, in the 2012 third installment of the series, My Super Psycho Sweet 16: Part 3. In 2013, McKnight played Elizabeth the "Lizard" on ''Once Upon a Time in Wonderland.

Personal life

McKnight has three younger brothers.

In an interview, McKnight said that when she is not working, she is usually out with friends. She loves going to movies, or out to local concerts.

In January 2016 McKnight was the lead subject of a New York Times article about Los Angeles based actors and artists taking jobs driving for Uber and Lyft in between acting and artistic jobs.

Filmography

Film

Television

References

External links
 
 Lauren McKnight on Myspace

1988 births
Living people
Actresses from Los Angeles
21st-century American women